Luceafărul Club Râmnicelu is a Romanian oina team in the National Senior Championship.

External links
Romanian Federation of Oina 

Oina teams